Carlos César Sampaio Campos (born 31 March 1968) is a Brazilian football pundit and retired footballer, who played as a midfielder.

Club career
A former defensive midfielder, César Sampaio is one of the few players who played for the four major clubs from São Paulo (Santos, Palmeiras, Corinthians and São Paulo). A Palmeiras legend, he is considered one of the greatest players in the club's history, having played with the team from 1991 to 1994 and from 1999 to 2000. He won the Bola de Ouro (Brazilian Golden Ball award) twice, in 1990 and 1993.

International career
César Sampaio joined the Brazil national football team during the Copa América in 1993, but was not part of the team during the FIFA World Cup finals in neither 1990 nor 1994.

He was later also part of the Brazilian squad that won both the Copa América and the FIFA Confederations Cup in 1997, and played for Brazil at the 1998 FIFA World Cup finals, where he made six appearances in the team's run to the final, which they lost to the hosts of the tournament, France. At the 1998 FIFA World Cup finals, he became remembered for scoring the first goal of the entire tournament in the 4th minute of Brazil's opening match against Scotland, a header from a corner by Bebeto on the left. He also scored a brace in Brazil's 4–1 victory against Chile in the round of 16 during the same tournament.

Sampaio is also remembered for helping Ronaldo when he suffered a convulsive fit in the night before the 1998 FIFA World Cup final.

After retirement
César Sampaio retired from professional football in 2004. He has recently said that he wants to become a manager and he is starting his coaching badges.

Career statistics

Club

International

Honours

Club
Palmeiras
Campeonato Brasileiro Série A (Brazilian championship): 1993, 1994
Campeonato Paulista (São Paulo State championship): 1993, 1994
Tournament Rio – São Paulo: 1993, 2000
Copa do Brasil: 1998
Mercosul Cup: 1998
Copa Libertadores de América: 1999

Yokohama Flügels
Asian Cup Winners' Cup: 1995 
Asian Super Cup: 1995
Emperor's Cup: 1998

Deportivo
Supercopa de España: 2000

Corinthians
Campeonato Paulista (São Paulo State championship): 2001

International
Brazil
FIFA World Cup Runner-up: 1998
FIFA Confederations Cup: 1997
Copa América: 1997

Individual
Brazilian Golden Ball: 1990, 1993
Brazilian Silver Ball: 1990, 1993

References

External links

1968 births
Living people
Footballers from São Paulo
Association football midfielders
Brazilian footballers
Brazilian expatriate footballers
La Liga players
Campeonato Brasileiro Série A players
Santos FC players
Sociedade Esportiva Palmeiras players
Deportivo de La Coruña players
São Paulo FC players
Sport Club Corinthians Paulista players
Expatriate footballers in Japan
J1 League players
J2 League players
Yokohama Flügels players
Kashiwa Reysol players
Sanfrecce Hiroshima players
1993 Copa América players
1995 Copa América players
1997 Copa América players
1997 FIFA Confederations Cup players
1998 FIFA World Cup players
Copa América-winning players
Copa Libertadores-winning players
FIFA Confederations Cup-winning players
Brazil international footballers
Brazil under-20 international footballers
Brazilian expatriate sportspeople in Spain
Brazilian expatriate sportspeople in Indonesia
Brazilian expatriate sportspeople in Japan
Expatriate footballers in Spain
Expatriate footballers in Indonesia